The Chinese Taipei women's national beach handball team is the national team of Chinese Taipei. It takes part in international beach handball competitions.

World Championships results

  2014  – 10th place
  2016  – 6th place
  2018  – 13th place
  2022  – Did not qualify

References

External links
Official website
IHF profile

Women's national beach handball teams
Beach handball